Edward Strutt may refer to:
Edward Strutt (missionary) (1853-1911), British Wesleyan missionary to Sri Lanka
 Edward Strutt, 1st Baron Belper (1801–1880), British Liberal Party politician
 Edward Lisle Strutt (1874–1948), soldier and mountaineer, grandson of the above
 Edward Gerald Strutt (1854–1930), agriculturalist and land agent